Nysæter Church is a parish church of the Church of Norway in Stord Municipality in Vestland county, Norway. It is located in the village of Sagvåg on the southwestern coast of the island of Stord. It is the church for the Nysæter parish which is part of the Sunnhordland prosti (deanery) in the Diocese of Bjørgvin. The red brick church was built in a fan-shaped design in 1991 using plans drawn up by the architect Colin Ansbach. The church seats about 350 people.

History
Planning for a new church in Sagvåg began during the late 1980s. Colin Ansbach was hired to design a new brick church. Construction took place during 1990-1991, finishing up in the fall of 1991. The church was consecrated in January 1992.

See also
List of churches in Bjørgvin

References

Stord
Churches in Vestland
Fan-shaped churches in Norway
Brick churches in Norway
20th-century Church of Norway church buildings
Churches completed in 1991
1991 establishments in Norway